Umar ibn al-Khattab was one of the earliest figures in the history of Islam.  While Sunnis regard Umar ibn al-Khattab in high esteem and respect his place as one of the "Four Righteously Guided Caliphs", the Shia do not view him as a legitimate leader of the Ummah and believe that Umar and Abu Bakr conspired to usurp power from Ali. This belief arises from the incident of Saqifa as well the hadith of the pen and paper. Shia believe that the Sunni view of Umar was created by the later Umayyad dynasty to honour the man that gave power to the first Umayyad ruler and third Sunni Caliph, Uthman. In this way, it gives legitimacy to Umar's consultation that started their own dynasty. Shia believe that the Umayyad view was propagated with lethal force and heavy duress and as time went on, that view became predominant and was cemented by the works of Bukhari.

Shi'a Biography

Embracing Islam
A Sh'ia scholar states:

Hafsa bint Umar
Hafsa, the daughter of Umar, was originally married to Khunais ibn Hudhaifa. When he died, Umar sought to find a husband for her. He approached his friend Uthman who said "I am of the opinion that I shall not marry at present", after thinking about the proposal for a few days. Umar became angry with Uthman and asked Abu Bakr the same thing. Abu Bakr did not give him a reply, causing Umar to become even more angry with him than he was with Uthman. Umar then preceded to Muhammad to discuss the previous two incidents. Muhammad reassured Umar by saying that "Hafsa will marry one better than Uthman will marry one better than Abu Bakr." Umar was obviously alluding to the fact that Hafsa was to marry Muhammad and that Uthman was to marry a daughter of Muhammad.

Hafsa was married to Muhammad in 625.  Muhammad's household was not always peaceful as his wives were in two groups. Umar said on one occasion:

"Hafsa, the news has reached me that you cause Allah's Messenger trouble. You know that Allah's Messenger does not love you, and had I not been (your father) he would have divorced you." (On hearing this) she wept bitterly.''

Pen and paper

 writes:

After Muhammad

Shia claim that the despair felt by Umar at the time of Muhammad's death was not genuine, they insist that there was no despair, only threats aimed to delay matters so that his friend and confederate Abu Bakr could return before Ali was confirmed as the successor. As for Ali's allegiance to Abu Bakr's rule, this too was made up to support Abu Bakr's claim to power.

Alleged Coup d'état

 writes:

Abu Bakr's era
Shi'a view Umar as the "khalifa-maker" of Abu Bakr and that during Abu Bakr's khilafat, Umar was his principal adviser. Ali is quoted saying:

"I watched the plundering of my inheritance till the first one [Abu Bakr] went his way but handed over the Caliphate to Ibn al-Khattab after himself."

(Then he quoted al-A'sha's verse):

"My days are now passed on the camel's back (in difficulty) while there were days [of ease] when I enjoyed the company of Jabir's brother Hayyan."

(Implying the contrast between the present and the time of Muhammad)

"It is strange that during his [Abu Bakr] lifetime he wished to be released from the caliphate but he confirmed it for the other one [Umar] after his death. No doubt these two shared its udders strictly among themselves".

Umar's Caliphate

 states:

Marriage to Umm Kulthum bint Ali 
The majority of Shi'a's are in agreement that Umm Kulthum, the daughter of the Ali, was not married to Umar. One narration concerning the marriage is,

Ali is further quoted in the same sermon:

"This one [Umar] put the Caliphate in a tough enclosure where the utterance was haughty and the touch was rough. Mistakes were in plenty and so also the excuses therefore. One in contact with it was like the rider of an unruly camel. If he pulled up its rein the very nostril would be slit, but if he let it loose he would be thrown. Consequently, by Allah people got involved in recklessness, wickedness, unsteadiness and deviation".

Death
It is recorded in some Shi'a texts that Ali said:

 writes:

Views on the Non-Muslim view
Edward Gibbon wrote:

And he also writes that Ali...

See also
Sunni view of Umar

Shia view of Ali ibn Abi Talib

References

Umar
Umar